The Royal Road was an ancient highway reorganized and rebuilt by the Persian king Darius the Great (Darius I) of the first (Achaemenid) Persian Empire in the 5th century BC. Darius built the road to facilitate rapid communication on the western part of his large empire from Susa to Sardis.  Mounted couriers of the Angarium were supposed to travel  from Susa to Sardis in nine days; the journey took ninety days on foot.

Course of the Royal Road
The course of the road has been reconstructed from the writings of Herodotus, archeological research, and other historical records. It began in Sardis near the Aegean coast of Lydia, traveled east through Anatolia (crossing the Halys according to Herodotus), and passed through the Cilician Gates to the old Assyrian capital Nineveh in upper Mesopotamia, then turned south to Babylon. From near Babylon, it is believed to have split into two routes, one traveling northeast then east through Ecbatana and then along the Silk Road (via the Great Khurasan Road), the other continuing east through the future Persian capital Susa and then southeast to Persepolis in the Zagros Mountains. Of course, such long routes for travellers and tradesmen would often take months on end, and during the reign of Darius the Great numerous royal outposts (Caravanserai) were built.

History of the Royal Road
Because the road did not follow the shortest nor the easiest route between the most important cities of the Persian Empire, archeologists believe the westernmost sections of the road may have originally been built by the Assyrian kings, as the road plunges through the heart of their old empire. More eastern segments of the road, identifiable in present-day northern Iran, were not noted by Herodotus, whose view of Persia was that of an Ionian Greek in the West; stretches of the Royal Road across the central plateau of Iran are coincident with the major trade route known as the Silk Road. This route was used by couriers to deliver messages to the Persian capital.

However, Darius I improved the existing road network into the Royal Road as it is recognized today.  A later improvement by the Romans of a road bed with a hard-packed gravelled surface of 6.25 m width held within a stone curbing was found in a stretch near Gordium and connecting the parts together in a unified whole stretching some 1677 miles, primarily as a post road, with a hundred and eleven posting stations maintained with a supply of fresh horses, a quick mode of communication using relays of swift mounted messengers, the kingdom's pirradazis.

The construction of the road as improved by Darius was of such quality that the road continued to be used until Roman times. A bridge at Diyarbakır, Turkey, still stands from this period of the road's use. The road also helped Persia increase long-distance trade, which reached its peak during the time of Alexander the Great (Alexander III of Macedon).

In 1961, under a grant from the American Philosophical Society, S. F. Starr traced the stretch of road from Gordium to Sardis, identifying river crossings by ancient bridge abutments. It was maintained by personal guards. The road also was made secure by the Persians. Guard posts were stationed along the road, patrols were also made to secure the route. The Royal Road would be a monument of the Persian Empire.

Legacy
The Greek historian Herodotus wrote, "There is nothing in the world that travels faster than these Persian couriers." Herodotus's praise for these messengers—"Neither snow nor rain nor heat nor gloom of night stays these couriers from the swift completion of their appointed rounds"— was inscribed on the James Farley Post Office in New York and is sometimes thought of as the United States Postal Service creed.

A metaphorical "Royal Road" in famous quotations
Euclid is said to have replied to King Ptolemy's request for an easier way of learning mathematics that "there is no Royal Road to geometry", according to Proclus.

Charles Sanders Peirce, in his How to Make Our Ideas Clear (1878), says, "There is no royal road to logic, and really valuable ideas can only be had at the price of close attention." This essay was claimed by William James as instrumental in the foundation of the philosophical school of pragmatism.

Sigmund Freud famously described dreams as the "royal road to the unconscious" ("Via regia zur Kenntnis des Unbewußten").

Karl Marx wrote in the 1872 Preface to the French Edition of Das Kapital (Volume 1), "There is no royal road to science, and only those who do not dread the fatiguing climb of its steep paths have a chance of gaining its luminous summits."

The Royal Road to Romance (1925) is the first book by Richard Halliburton, covering his world travels as a young man from Andorra to Angkor.

See also

 Achaemenid Empire
 Angaria (Roman law)
 Angarum
 Baghdad Railway
 Chapar Khaneh
 El Camino Real (California)
 History of Iran
 Inca road system
 Persian Corridor
 Trans-Iranian Railway
 Via Regia (Germany)
 Great Trunk Road
 Khurasan Road

Notes

References

External links
 

Trade routes
Achaemenid Empire
Ancient roads and tracks
Historic roads in Turkey
Roads in Iran
Roads in Iraq
Iranian inventions